Ernst Kozub (January 24, 1924 – December 27, 1971) was a German tenor and opera singer.

Kozub was born in Duisburg, Germany. Though his early death prevented him from fully realising his promise, he stands out as one of the notable heldentenor voices of the 1960s. He is best known for his  Wagnerian roles, including Erik in Der fliegende Holländer (which he recorded with Theo Adam and Anja Silja in 1968). Because of the quality of his voice, John Culshaw cast him as Siegfried in the Decca recording of Der Ring des Nibelungen, but his failure to learn the role caused him to be replaced at the last minute by Wolfgang Windgassen

Kozub died in 1971 in Bad Soden, having only performed his last Tannhäuser in Italy three weeks before his death.

References
Culshaw, John, Ring Resounding Secker & Warburg, 1968. 
Culshaw, John, Putting the Record Straight  Secker & Warburg, 1981. 

1924 births
1971 deaths
German operatic tenors
Heldentenors
20th-century German male opera singers
People from Duisburg